Henri Edmond Simon Gatineau (18 March 1897 – 18 February 1984) was a French rower. He competed at the 1924 Summer Olympics and the 1928 Summer Olympics.

References

External links
 

1897 births
1984 deaths
French male rowers
Olympic rowers of France
Rowers at the 1924 Summer Olympics
Rowers at the 1928 Summer Olympics
People from Saint-Mandé
Sportspeople from Val-de-Marne